This article contains a list of people, places, and things involved in as well as events that took place during the Cold War that are referenced in the board game Twilight Struggle.

Early War Cards 
U.S.A.
Duck and Cover (Duck and Cover (film))
NATO (North Atlantic Treaty)
Containment
East European Unrest
 Hungarian Revolution of 1956
 Prague Spring
Special Relationship
 Five Year Plan (Five-year plans of the Soviet Union)
Independent Reds
 Tito–Stalin split
 Albanian–Soviet split
 De-satellization of Communist Romania
CIA Created (History of the Central Intelligence Agency)
Formosan Resolution (Formosa Resolution of 1955)
NORAD (North American Aerospace Defense Command)
Truman Doctrine
Marshall Plan
US/Japan Mutual Defense Pact (Treaty of Mutual Cooperation and Security Between the United States and Japan)
Defectors (List of Soviet and Eastern Bloc defectors)
Kremlin Flu (Lists of members of the Politburo of the Communist Party of the Soviet Union)
Nationalist China (Republic of China (1912–1949)#Post-World War II)

Neutral

 Captured Nazi Scientists (Operation Paperclip)
 Indo-Pakistani War
 Indo-Pakistani War of 1947–1948
 Indo-Pakistani War of 1965
 Indo-Pakistani War of 1971
UN Intervention (United Nations#Cold War Era)
The China Card
Olympic Games
 1980 Summer Olympics boycott
 1984 Summer Olympics boycott
Red Scare/Purge
 Red Scare#Second Red Scare (1947–1957)
 Purges of the Communist Party of the Soviet Union
Nuclear Test Ban (Partial Nuclear Test Ban Treaty)

U.S.S.R

 Socialist Governments
 Italian Communist Party#Post-war years
 Italian Socialist Party#Post-World War II
 French Left#Post-war developments
 History of the Labour Party (UK)#Post-War victory under Clement Attlee
Blockade (Berlin Blockade)
Arab-Israeli War
 1948 Arab–Israeli War
 Second Arab–Israeli War
 Six-Day War
 War of Attrition
 Yom Kippur War
 1982 Lebanon War
Warsaw Pact Formed
Decolonization (Decolonization#After 1945)
Fidel (Fidel Castro)
Korean War
Comecon
De Gaulle Leads France (Charles de Gaulle#1958–1962: Founding of the Fifth Republic)
De-Stalinization
Vietnam Revolts (Battle of Dien Bien Phu)
Romanian Abdication (Michael I of Romania#Forced abdication)
Nasser (Gamal Abdel Nasser)
Suez Crisis
The Cambridge Five
First Lightning (RDS-1)
Who Lost China (Loss of China)

Mid War Cards 
U.S.A.
Nuclear Subs (History of submarines#Post-War)
Colonial Rear Guards
Malayan Emergency
Algerian War
South African Border War
Puppet Governments (Puppet state#Decolonization and Cold War)
OAS Founded (Charter of the Organization of American States)
Shuttle Diplomacy
"Ask not what your country can do for you..." (Inauguration of John F. Kennedy#Inaugural address)
Bear Trap (Soviet–Afghan War)
Panama Canal Returned (Torrijos–Carter Treaties)
Grain Sales to Soviets (Great Grain Robbery)
Nixon Plays The China Card (Richard Nixon's 1972 visit to China)
The Voice of America (Voice of America#Cold War)
Alliance for Progress
Kitchen Debates
Camp David Accords
John Paul II Elected Pope (Holy See–Soviet Union relations#John Paul II and Soviet collapse: 1978 to 1991)
Sadat Expels Soviets (History of Egypt under Anwar Sadat)
Ussuri River Skirmish (Sino-Soviet border conflict)
Our Man in Tehran (Mohammad Reza Pahlavi)
Mobutu Sese Seko
"Don't Wait For The Translation" (Adlai Stevenson II#Cuban Missile Crisis)

Neutral

 Brush War
 Mozambican Civil War
 Ogaden War
 Arms Race (Nuclear arms race)
 Summit (List of Soviet Union–United States summits)
 Missile Envy (Helen Caldicott)
 Cuban Missile Crisis
 How I Learned to Stop Worrying (Dr. Strangelove)
 ABM Treaty (Anti-Ballistic Missile Treaty)
 "One Small Step..."
Neil Armstrong
 Creation of NASA
 Project Mercury
 Apollo 11
 SALT Negotiations (Strategic Arms Limitation Talks)
 Junta (Military junta)
 1976 Argentine coup d'état
 1954 Guatemalan coup d'état
 Latin American Death Squads
 Death squad#Central America
 Death squad#South America
Non-Aligned Movement (Non-Aligned Movement#Origins and the Cold War)

U.S.S.R

 Quagmire (Vietnam War)
 Portuguese Empire Crumbles (Portuguese Empire#Decolonization (1951–1999))
 Willy Brandt
 Flower Power
 "Lone Gunman"
 Assassination of John F. Kennedy
 Assassination of Martin Luther King Jr.
 Assassination of Robert F. Kennedy
 We Will Bury You
 South African Unrest (History of South Africa#Apartheid era (1948–1994))
 Muslim Revolution (Iranian Revolution)
 U2 Incident (1960 U-2 incident)
 Liberation Theology (Latin American liberation theology)
 Brezhnev Doctrine
 Allende (Salvador Allende)
 Cultural Revolution
 OPEC
 OPEC#1960–1975 founding and expansion
 OPEC#1973–1974 oil embargo
 Che (Che Guevara)
Berlin Wall

Late War Cards 
U.S.A.

 The Iron Lady (Margaret Thatcher)
 Star Wars (Strategic Defense Initiative)
 Soviets Shoot Down KAL-007 (Korean Air Lines Flight 007)
 Tear Down This Wall
 Solidarity (Solidarity (Polish trade union))
 Reagan Bombs Libya (1986 United States bombing of Libya)
 North Sea Oil
 Chernobyl (Chernobyl disaster)
 "An Evil Empire" (Evil Empire speech)
 AWACS Sale to Saudis (US–Saudi Arabia AWACS Sale)

Neutral

 Terrorism
 Palestine Liberation Organization
 Achille Lauro hijacking
 Munich massacre
 Red Brigades
 Japanese Red Army
 Wargames
 Brinkmanship
 Mutual assured destruction
 List of nuclear close calls#9 November 1979
 Norwegian rocket incident
 Iran–Iraq War
Stanislav Petrov

U.S.S.R.

 Iran Hostage Crisis
 Marine Barracks Bombing (1983 Beirut barracks bombings)
 Ortega Elected in Nicaragua (Daniel Ortega#Sandinista revolution (1979–1990))
 Latin American Debt Crisis
 Pershing II Deployed (Pershing II#Deployment)
 Intermediate-Range Nuclear Forces Treaty
 The Reformer (Perestroika)
 Glasnost
 Iran-Contra Scandal (Iran–Contra affair)
 Aldrich Ames Remix
 Yuri and Samantha (Samantha Smith)

Space Race 

 H-Bomb (Thermonuclear weapon)
 Ivy Mike
 Joe 4
 Earth Satellite
 Sputnik 1
 Explorer 1
 Animal in Space
 Laika
 Ham (chimpanzee)
 ICBMs (Intercontinental ballistic missile#Cold War)
 R-7 Semyorka
 SM-65 Atlas
 Man in Space
 Yuri Gagarin#Vostok 1
 Alan Shepard#Freedom 7
 Man in Earth Orbit
 John Glenn#Friendship 7 flight
 Lunar Orbit
 Luna 10
 Lunar Orbiter 1
 Apollo 8
 Soviet crewed lunar programs
 Eagle/Bear has Landed (Apollo 11)
 MIRVs (Multiple independently targetable reentry vehicle)
 LGM-30 Minuteman#Minuteman-III (LGM-30G)
 R-36 (missile)
 Anti-Ballistic Missiles
 Nike Zeus
 ABM-1 Galosh
 Neutron Bombs
 Space Shuttle
 Buran (spacecraft)
 Space Station
 Salyut programme
 Skylab
 Mir
 SDI (Strategic Defense Initiative)

Crisis Cards 

 Chinese Civil War
 Yalta and Potsdam
 Yalta Conference
 Potsdam Conference
 1945 UK Election (1945 United Kingdom general election)
 Israel
 Bricha
 Jewish insurgency in Mandatory Palestine
 1947–1948 civil war in Mandatory Palestine
 Provisional government of Israel
 VE Day (Victory in Europe Day)
 End of World War II in Europe
 German Instrument of Surrender
 VJ Day (Victory over Japan Day)
 End of World War II in Asia
 Surrender of Japan

Statecraft 
U.S.A.

 Kennan (George F. Kennan)
 Acheson (Dean Acheson)
 Dulles (John Foster Dulles)
 Marshall (George C. Marshall)
 OSS (Office of Strategic Services)

U.S.S.R.
 Andropov (Yuri Andropov)
 Molotov (Vyacheslav Molotov)
 Khrushchev (Nikita Khrushchev)
 Beria (Lavrentiy Beria)
 KGB

Turn Leaders 

 Joseph Stalin
 Harry S. Truman
 Dwight D. Eisenhower
 Nikita Khrushchev
 John F. Kennedy
 Leonid Brezhnev
 Richard Nixon
 Jimmy Carter
 Ronald Reagan
 Mikhail Gorbachev

Territories 

Superpowers

 United States
 Soviet Union

West Europe

 United Kingdom
 Canada
 France
 West Germany
 Italy
 Greece
 Turkey
 Spain
 Portugal
 Benelux
 Norway
 Sweden
 Denmark

West/East Europe

 Finland
 Austria

East Europe

 East Germany
 Poland
 Czechoslovakia
 Hungary
 Yugoslavia
 Romania
 Bulgaria

Middle East

 Israel
 Iraq
 Iran
 Lebanon
 Syria
 Gulf States (Arab states of the Persian Gulf)
 Saudi Arabia
 Jordan
 Egypt
 Libya

Asia

 China

 North Korea
 South Korea
 Japan
 Taiwan
 Australia
 Afghanistan
 Pakistan
 India

South East Asia

 Burma (Myanmar)
 Laos
 Cambodia
 Thailand
 Vietnam
 Malaysia
 Philippines
 Indonesia

Central America

 Cuba
 Mexico
 Guatemala
 El Salvador
 Honduras
 Nicaragua
 Haiti
 Dominican Republic
 Costa Rica
 Panama

South America

 Venezuela
 Brazil
 Colombia
 Ecuador
 Peru
 Bolivia
 Chile
 Paraguay
 Uruguay
 Argentina

Africa

 Algeria
 Tunisia
 Morocco
 West African States
 Saharan States
 Ivory Coast
 Nigeria
 Sudan
 Ethiopia
 Somalia
 Cameroon
 Zaire
 Kenya
 Angola
 South East African States
 Zimbabwe
 Botswana
 South Africa

Game mechanics 
 DEFCON
 Coup (Coup d'état)
 Influence (Sphere of influence#Cold War (1947–91))
 Realignment (Political realignment)
 Military Operations
 Stability Number (List of countries by Fragile States Index)

Notes 

P.Promo expansion
Z.Turn Zero expansion
S.Alternate Space Race track
Cold War